Abbey College in Malvern, Worcestershire, England, is a small boarding school providing secondary education to a diverse and international student body. The present college was founded in 1979 on a site that had been used for education since 1874. The Abbey School (a girls' boarding school) occupied the premises between 1908 and 1979

The school sits on a  campus alongside the Malvern Hills between Great Malvern and Malvern Wells. It is co-educational with around 100 students on its roll and specialises in secondary and pre-university education and English as a second or foreign language (ESOL).

In 2020, Daniel Booker was installed as the college's new principal.

The college offers academic courses including GCSE, IGCSE, A level and foundation courses, as well as short courses and high school experience courses. It runs vacation courses for groups and individuals throughout the Summer. Abbey College also has a centre in Prague which offers pathway programmes for medical studies, with routes into universities across Europe. Abbey College Prague provides preparation courses (delivered in English), in cooperation with Charles University's Institute for Language and Preparatory Studies in Prague which are designed for international students interested in careers in medicine or dentistry.

References

Boarding schools in Worcestershire
Private schools in Worcestershire
Schools in Malvern, Worcestershire
International schools in the United Kingdom
Educational institutions established in 1979
1979 establishments in England
Malvern, Worcestershire